"Makes No Sense at All" is a song by Hüsker Dü from the album Flip Your Wig. Written by Bob Mould, the song was one that Mould felt aged well. The song was released as the debut single from the album, reaching number 2 on the UK indie charts.

The song has since seen positive critical reception and has been performed live by both Hüsker Dü and Mould at his solo shows.

Background
"Makes No Sense at All" was written by Hüsker Dü singer and guitarist Bob Mould. The track demonstrated Hüsker Dü's continued move away from their hardcore punk roots to a more melodic, pop-influenced style. Mould said of the song,

Mould described the song as the song that the band would play if the band "knew there would only be seven minutes left before the missiles fell."

Release
"Makes No Sense at All" was the only single from Flip Your Wig. The single's B-side was a cover of "Love Is All Around", the theme song to The Mary Tyler Moore Show. The single was a hit on the indie circuits, reaching number 2 on the UK indie charts.

Music videos for both "Makes No Sense at All" and "Love Is All Around" were produced. These featured clips of the band and shots of Minneapolis. For the "Love is All Around" sequence the video has the band copying iconic scenes from the Minneapolis-based Mary Tyler Moore Show opening credit sequence, such as leaving Dayton's and riding the escalator and eating at the IDS Center.

Mould continues to perform "Makes no Sense at All" during his solo tours.

Reception
In a review on AllMusic, the song is called "perhaps the group's greatest fusion of punk and pop...Mould had, quite simply, written one of his best melodies, capable of containing the furious energy of his guitar style while still offering a potent melodic hook that made the most of the band's psychedelic undertow." Rob Tannenbaum of Rolling Stone said the song "could almost be termed catchy."

Charts

References

1985 songs
Hüsker Dü songs
Song recordings produced by Bob Mould
Songs written by Bob Mould
SST Records singles
American power pop songs